Statistics of Antigua and Barbuda Premier Division during the 2013–14 season.

League table 

 1.SAP               18  14  4  0  43-13  46  Champions
 2.Parham            18  12  2  4  38-18  38
 3.Hoppers           18  11  1  6  38-20  34
 4.Jennings Grenades 18   8  3  7  34-23  27
 5.Bassa             18   7  4  7  30-28  25
 6.Fort Road        18   7  2  9  34-39  23
 7.Old Road          18   5  7  6  25-23  22
 -------------------------------------------
 8.Willikies         18   5  2 11  17-31  17  Relegation Playoff
 -------------------------------------------
 9.All Saints United 18   4  5  9  17-40  17  Relegated
 10.Potters Tigers   18   1  2 15  16-57   5  Relegated

References
Antigua and Barbuda 2013/14 at RSSSF

Antigua and Barbuda Premier Division
Antigua and Barbuda Premier Division seasons
2013–14 in Antigua and Barbuda football